Chadwick Oliver Kinch ( – ) was an American professional basketball player. He was a 6'4" (1.93 m) 190 lb (86 kg) shooting guard and played collegiately at the University of North Carolina at Charlotte after starring at Perth Amboy High School in Perth Amboy, New Jersey, his place of birth.

He was selected with the 22nd pick in the first round of the 1980 NBA draft by the Cleveland Cavaliers. He spent his only NBA season (1980–81) split between the Cavaliers and the Dallas Mavericks. The Cavs traded Kinch, along with a 1985 first-round draft choice, to the Mavericks in exchange for Geoff Huston and a 1983 third-round draft choice on February 7, 1981. Kinch averaged 2.9 points per game in his only season in the NBA.

The tragic loss of his brother, Raymond, in a house fire reportedly had a profound effect on Kinch and impacted his NBA career.  After leaving the NBA and starting a family, he descended further into a fierce drug habit, eventually contracting HIV. Kinch died of AIDS-related complications in 1994, aged 35, at his home in Carteret, New Jersey.

Notes

External links
NBA stats @ basketballreference.com
Chad Kinch profile @ thedraftreview.com

season in the NB
1958 births
1994 deaths
AIDS-related deaths in New Jersey
American men's basketball players
Basketball players from New Jersey
Charlotte 49ers men's basketball players
Cleveland Cavaliers draft picks
Cleveland Cavaliers players
Dallas Mavericks players
People from Carteret, New Jersey
Perth Amboy High School alumni
Shooting guards
Sportspeople from Perth Amboy, New Jersey